Aspegren is a surname. Notable people with the surname include:

August Aspegren (1844–1912), Finnish stage actor
Aurora Aspegren (1844–1911), Finnish stage actress, wife of August
Felipe Aspegren (born 1994), Finnish football player
Lennart Aspegren (born 1931), Swedish judge

Swedish-language surnames